The Supreme Court of the United States handed down seven per curiam opinions during its 2021 term, which began October 4, 2021 and concluded October 2, 2022.

Because per curiam decisions are issued from the Court as an institution, these opinions all lack the attribution of authorship or joining votes to specific justices. All justices on the Court at the time the decision was handed down are assumed to have participated and concurred unless otherwise noted.

Court membership

Chief Justice: John Roberts

Associate Justices: Clarence Thomas, Stephen Breyer, Samuel Alito, Sonia Sotomayor, Elena Kagan, Neil Gorsuch, Brett Kavanaugh, Amy Coney Barrett

Rivas-Villegas v. Cortesluna

City of Tahlequah v. Bond

United States v. Texas

Biden v. Missouri

National Federation of Independent Business v. Department of Labor, Occupational Safety and Health Administration

Wisconsin Legislature v. Wisconsin Elections Commission

Arizona v. City and County of San Francisco

See also 
 List of United States Supreme Court cases, volume 595
 List of United States Supreme Court cases, volume 596

Notes

References

 

United States Supreme Court per curiam opinions
Lists of 2021 term United States Supreme Court opinions
2021 per curiam